Powellisetia comes is an extinct species of marine gastropod mollusc in the family Rissoidae. First described by Harold John Finlay in 1926, it is known to have lived in New Zealand during the early Miocene.

Description

Finlay described the species as follows:

Distribution

Fossils of the species have only been identified in New Zealand. The holotype was collected from the Mount Harris Formation near Pukeuri, Otago, which dates to the early Miocene era.

References

Rissoidae
Gastropods described in 1926
Gastropods of New Zealand
Extinct animals of New Zealand
Miocene animals of Oceania
Miocene extinctions
Prehistoric gastropods
Molluscs of the Pacific Ocean
Taxa named by Harold John Finlay